Colin Andrew Ignatius Peter McFarlane (born 15 September 1961) is an English actor, narrator and voice actor. He is best known for his role as Gillian B. Loeb in two films of Christopher Nolan's The Dark Knight Trilogy, Ulysses in the STARZ television drama series Outlander, the voice of Bulgy in the children's television series Thomas & Friends, the voice of PC Malcolm Williams in the children's television series Fireman Sam, and as the voice of "The Cube" on ITV.

He also appeared in The Commuter (2018), in which he played Conductor Sam, as Chancellor Riggs in the 2015 holiday television movie Crown for Christmas (2015), as General Pierce in the science fiction horror film Patient Zero (2018) and as Aloisius Dupree in three films of the Batzan Trilogy titled The Invisible Guardian, The Legacy of the Bones and Offering to the Storm in 2017, 2019 & 2020, respectively.

His voice roles in animation and video games include JJ in Bob the Builder, Thadius Vent in Oscar's Orchestra, Harrison in Chuggington, Sparkie the Dragon in Mike the Knight, Sergeant Slipper in Dennis and Gnasher, Thunder in Fable, Uzimushi in Shinobido: Way of the Ninja, The Forgotten One in Castlevania: Lords of Shadow, Avalon Centrifuge in LittleBigPlanet 2, Heimdall in Lego Marvel Super Heroes 2 and Bernard Goodwin in Planet Zoo.

Early life
McFarlane was born on 15 September 1961 in Upper Clapton, London, to Jamaican parents. His father, Sidney McFarlane MBE served in the RAF and his mother, Gwendolyn McFarlane worked in the NHS. His father was awarded the MBE in 1999 for voluntary service to the community and for service with the Ministry of Defence. The family subsequently moved several times before settling in Lincoln, where McFarlane grew up. He attended the Perse School, Cambridge, and later read drama at Loughborough University, graduating in 1983.

Career

Television
Mcfarlane's first professional television role was in 1985 with a three episode guest stint, as Detective Sergeant Watson, in ITV's hit police procedural Dempsey and Makepeace. From there, he would go on to feature in London Weekend Television's made-for-TV film Dutch Girls, alongside Colin Firth and fellow Outlander alumni Bill Paterson. The next year he featured in an episode of London Weekend Television's maternity mini-series To Have and To Hold, which focused on a surrogate mother carrying a child for her sister. In 1988, McFarlane guest starred in a season two episode of ITV's drama Bust,  which followed a man in the wake of bankruptcy.

1992 saw McFarlane appear in CITV's children's series Tales From the Poop Deck, where he portrayed Lieutenant Parkinson of HMS Intrepid, and a guest appearance on several episodes of Channel 4's sitcom Sean's Show. Later that year he would feature in an episode of mystery series Virtual Murder, an episode of BBC's anthology series Screen One entitled Black and Blue, and the made-for-TV film Lenny Henry: In Dreams. In 1993 he would guest star in children's series Runaway Bay and ITV's comedy Jeeves and Wooster, which focused on Hugh Laurie's Wooster and Stephen Fry's Jeeves. Two years later he would have guest appearances on ITV's Class Act and BBC's police procedural Backup.

McFarlane would go on, in 1996, to feature in an episode of BBC's Rowan Atkinson led police comedy The Thin Blue Line, Channel 4's made-for-TV film The Final Passage, and the finale of ITV's four part thriller series Circles of Deceit.

His numerous TV credits include Judge John Deed, Jonathan Creek, Casualty, Death in Paradise, Father Brown and Holby City. He has also appeared in two of the UK's most-watched soap operas. He appeared in five episodes of Coronation Street from August to September 2010 as a consultant neurosurgeon, Mr Jordan, and played DCI Irving in an episode of EastEnders in April 2014 as part of the "Who Killed Lucy Beale?" storyline.

He has also made regular appearances in British TV comedy, in the shows The Fast Show, Randall & Hopkirk, Two Pints of Lager and a Packet of Crisps, Harry and Paul and The Thin Blue Line. He played Inspector Norris in the Black Books episode The Blackout, Inspector Terrence Brown in the first episode of Dirk Gently and voiced the Judge in the 2016 revival of the sitcom Porridge.

He also featured in the CBBC shows M.I. High and Hounded as the evil Dr Muhahahaha.

Film
McFarlane's first film was 1996's short film A Mulatto Song, which focused on the life of George Bridgetower, a virtuoso violinist from the late eighteenth and early nineteenth centuries. The next year would see him feature in the direct-to-film film I'd Like A Word With You, a corporate training video on how to deal with discipline interviews. He portrayed Police Commissioner Gillian B. Loeb in the critically acclaimed films Batman Begins (2005) and The Dark Knight (2008). He has also made numerous appearances in the Doctor Who franchise, voicing the Heavenly Host in the Christmas special  "Voyage of the Damned" and playing Moran in the "Under the Lake" and "Before the Flood" episodes of the ninth series from 2015. In addition, he also appeared in the third series of Torchwood, Children of Earth, as the American military representative Colonel Pierce.

He appears alongside Matt Smith and Natalie Dormer in the action horror film Patient Zero (2018). He then appeared as the governor in the 2019 thriller film Crawl, featuring Kaya Scodelario and Barry Pepper.

Voice acting
McFarlane's first voice role was in 1994 as Othello in S4C's Emmy Award winning animated series Shakespeare: The Animated Tales, which adapted and condensed classic Shakespearean plays for children. The next year would see him voice the main villain in BBC's animated series Oscar's Orchestra, which explored a future where music was banned. In 1996, McFarlane voiced two characters, God and Goliath, in the Emmy winning animated series Testament: The Bible in Animation. From there he would go on to voice the recurring role of Sergeant Slipper, from 1996 to 1998, in the animated Dennis the Menace cartoon Dennis and Gnasher.

His best-known voice roles include JJ and Skip in the original series of Bob the Builder, and as the narrator on the ITV gameshow The Cube. He has also voiced Jonah in the 1997 animated series Captain Pugwash, Bulgy the Double Decker Bus and Beresford the Crane in Thomas & Friends and its 2017 feature film Journey Beyond Sodor. In addition, he played the part of Elvis the horse in Iconicles, Sparky the dragon in Mike the Knight, voiced several characters in the episode "The Sweater" of The Amazing World of Gumball., and as well as Police Constable Malcolm Williams in the twelfth series of Fireman Sam and its 2020 1-hour special, Norman Price and the Mystery in the Sky.

He played US General Trent Stone in the 2014 original audio drama Osiris by Everybodyelse Productions.

Video games
McFarlane has lent his voice to numerous video games, the earliest being 1996's Broken Sword: The Shadow of the Templars. He would go on to voice characters in G-Police, Codename: Tenka, and The City of Lost Children in 1997. He also voiced Greg in the Buzz! quiz game series, the character Avalon Centrifuge in the 2011 game LittleBigPlanet 2, and provided additional dialogue for Batman: Arkham Knight. He played "The Forgotten One", the central villain of the two downloadable content packs for Castlevania: Lords of Shadow. Also lending his voice to Thunder, in the first Fable video game.

Theatre
In 2013, McFarlane appeared with Lenny Henry in a critically acclaimed revival of August Wilson's Fences at the Duchess Theatre in London's West End.

Personal life
On 12 July 1993, McFarlane married his wife, Kate, with whom he has one son, Josh. He divides his time between homes in Lincoln and North London.

McFarlane is an avid supporter of Lincoln City F.C.

Filmography

Film

Television

Theatre

Radio

Video games

References

External links
 

1961 births
Living people
20th-century English male actors
21st-century English male actors
Actors from Lincoln, England
Alumni of Loughborough University
Black British male actors
English male film actors
English male stage actors
English male television actors
English male voice actors
English people of Jamaican descent
Male actors from Lincolnshire
Male actors from London
People educated at The Perse School
People from Lincoln, England
People from Upper Clapton